Football clubs from Algerian Ligue Professionnelle 1 (Algeria) have been the most successful in Africa. since 1970, twenty-four Algerian clubs have evolved into African competitions. They can participate each year according to their results during the previous season in the various national competitions, during the sixties no Algerian club engages. The African football competitions are relatively recent and that there was only the African Cup of Champion Clubs, the first edition of which dates from the year 1964. This can be explained first by the fact that at that time most African countries recently gained independence. Everyone was not at the same level in terms of football, on the other hand there were also other football competitions whose geographical scope was restricted and represented only part of the African continent. These well established since the early sixties, the continental dimension of a test was still difficult to admit and tolerate, moreover the first editions will be organized and won by countries in the center and East of the continent African.

Several Algerian clubs have participated in these competitions, some even several times, but only JS Kabylie and ES Setif have crossed the symbolic threshold of 100 matches in African Cups, it is also the two most titled clubs with 6 and 3 titles respectively, in addition to the C1, JS Kabylie has the particularity of being the only Algerian team to have also won the C2 and the C3 (competition that no longer exists), only the Supercoupe misses its list, ES Setif for its part and the only team that won the C1 new formula launched since 1997, the representative of the city of Setif and also the only Algerian club that won the Supercup. JS Kabylie with its twenty-three participations in all competitions is the club with the most participations before ES Setif, which has fourteen. the period that began with the victory of MC Algiers in 1976) until the late eighties (victory of JS Kabylie in 1990), is the most prolific for the Algerian clubs that won four titles and achieved two finals. This period will see even Algerian football achieve three consecutive finals in African Cup champion clubs in 1988, 1989 and 1990.

Then it's nothingness, some clubs will frequently reach the quarter-finals see the semi-finals of an African competition; while others will make episodic appearances where only the participation seems to be their results. Despite the unrest that Algeria experienced (the "black decade" of the Algerian Civil War), his football succeeds somehow to survive even if it regresses somewhat. This is partly due to the good results of JS Kabylie who managed during the nineties to stay at the level of his rivals Maghreb, chaining a victory in 1990 in the Champions Clubs' Cup (and a half final lost in 1996), a victory in the African Cup of football cup winners in 1995 as well as a participation in a CAF Super Cup in 1996.

Overview

African Cup of Champions Clubs / CAF Champions League

African Cup of Champions Clubs participating clubs
PR : Preliminary round, FR : First round, SR : Second round, TR : Third round, QF : Quarter-finals, SF : Semi-finals, RU : Runners-up, W : Winners

CAF Champions League participating clubs
PR : Preliminary round, FR : First round, SR : Second round, GS : Group stage, QF : Quarter-finals, SF : Semi-finals, RU : Runners-up, W : Winners,  Disqualified

Statistics by club

CAF Confederation Cup

CAF Confederation Cup participating clubs
PR : Preliminary round, FR : First round, SR : Second round, PoR : Play-off round, GS : Group stage, QF : Quarter-finals, SF : Semi-finals, RU : Runners-up, W : Winners

Algerian clubs in African Finals

African Cup of Champions Clubs / CAF Champions League

CAF Confederation Cup

CAF Super Cup

CAF Cup (Defunct)

African Cup Winners' Cup (Defunct)

Afro-Asian Club Championship (Defunct)

References

 
 
African football clubs in international competitions